Viterbo is a city and comune in the Lazio region of central Italy, the capital of the province of Viterbo.

It conquered and absorbed the neighboring town of Ferento (see Ferentium) in its early history. The historic center of the city is surrounded by medieval walls, still intact, built during the 11th and 12th centuries. Entrance to the walled center of the city is through ancient gates.

Apart from agriculture, the main resources of Viterbo's area are pottery, marble, and wood. The town is home to the Italian gold reserves, an important Academy of Fine Arts, the University of Tuscia, and the Italian Army's Aviation Command headquarters and training centre. It is located in a wide thermal area, attracting many tourists from the whole of central Italy.

History
The first report of the new city dates to the eighth century AD, when it is identified as Castrum Viterbii. It was fortified in 773 by the Lombard King Desiderius in his vain attempt to conquer Rome. When the popes switched to the Frankish support, Viterbo became part of the Papal States, but this status was to be highly contested by the emperors in the following centuries, until in 1095 when it was known as a free comune.

In a period in which the popes had difficulties asserting their authority over Rome, Viterbo became their favourite residence, beginning with Pope Eugene III (1145–1146) who was besieged in vain in the city walls. In 1164, Frederick Barbarossa made Viterbo the seat of his antipope Paschal III. Three years later he gave it the title of "city" and used its militias against Rome. In 1172, Viterbo started its expansion, destroying the old city of Ferento and conquering other lands. In this age it was a rich and prosperous comune, one of the most important of Central Italy, with a population of almost 60,000.

In 1207, Pope Innocent III held a council in the cathedral, but the city was later excommunicated as the favourite seat of the heretical Patarines and even defeated by the Romans. In 1210, however, Viterbo managed to defeat Emperor Otto IV and was again at war against Rome.

In the thirteenth century it was ruled alternately by the tyrants of the Gatti and Di Vico families. Frederick II drew Viterbo to the Ghibelline side in 1240, but when the citizens expelled his turbulent German troops in 1243 he returned and besieged the city, but in vain. From that point Viterbo was always a loyal Guelph city. Between 1257 and 1261 it was the seat of Pope Alexander IV, who also died there. His successor Urban IV was elected in Viterbo.

In 1266–1268, Clement IV chose Viterbo as the base of his ruthless fight against the Hohenstaufen. Here, from the loggia of the papal palace, he excommunicated the army of Conradin of Swabia which was passing on the Via Cassia, with the prophetical motto of the "lamb who is going to the sacrifice". Other popes elected in Viterbo were Gregory X (1271) and John XXI (1276) (who died in the papal palace when the ceiling of the recently built library collapsed on him while he slept), Nicholas III and the French Martin IV. The Viterbese, who did not agree with the election of a foreigner directed by the King of Naples, Charles I of Anjou, invaded the cathedral where the conclave was held, arresting two of the cardinals. They were subsequently excommunicated, and the popes avoided Viterbo for 86 years.

Without the popes, the city fell into the hands of the Di Vicos. In the fourteenth century, Giovanni di Vico had created a seignory extending to Civitavecchia, Tarquinia, Bolsena, Orvieto, Todi, Narni and Amelia. His dominion was crushed by Cardinal Gil de Albornoz in 1354, sent by the Avignonese popes to recover the Papal States, who built the castle. In 1375, the city gave its keys to Francesco Di Vico, son of the previous tyrant, but thirteen years later the people killed him and assigned the city first to Pope Urban VI, and then to Giovanni di Sciarra di Vico, Francesco's cousin. But Pope Boniface IX's troops drove him away in 1396 and established a firm papal suzerainty over the city. The last Di Vico to hold power in Viterbo was Giacomo, who was defeated in 1431.

Thenceforth Viterbo became a city of secondary importance, following the vicissitudes of the Papal States.  In the 16th century it was the birthplace of Latino Latini.  It became part of Italy in 1871.

In 1927 Viterbo was made a provincial capital.

 During World War II Viterbo was occupied by the Wehrmacht after the Armistice of Cassibile and heavily bombed by the Allies, suffering over twenty raids between July 1943 and June 1944; this left a third of the city destroyed or badly damaged, and caused heavy damage to cultural heritage and 1,017 civilian deaths.

Geography

Climate 
Viterbo experiences a Mediterranean climate (Köppen climate classification: Csa).

Places of interest 

Viterbo's historic center is one of the best preserved medieval towns of central Italy. Many of the older buildings (particularly churches) are built on top of ancient ruins, recognizable by their large stones, 50 centimeters to a side. Viterbo is unique in Italy for its concentration of 'profferli', external staircases that were a frequent feature of medieval houses. The San Pellegrino quarter has an abundance of them, reflecting an architectural style that is unique to the town and the nearby region.

 Palazzo dei Papi or Papal Palace: A main attraction of Viterbo, the palace hosted the papacy for about two decades in the 13th century, and served as a country residence or refuge in time of trouble in Rome. The columns of the palace are spolia from a Roman temple.
 Cathedral of S. Lorenzo: The cathedral was originally erected as episcopal see of the exempt bishopric of Viterbo in Romanesque style by Lombard architects at the site of an ancient Roman temple of Hercules. It was rebuilt from the sixteenth century on, and heavily damaged in 1944 by Allied bombs. The Gothic belfry was built in the first half of the 14th century, and shows influence of Sienese architects. The church houses the sarcophagus of Pope John XXI and a picture Christ Blessing (1472) by Gerolamo da Cremona.
 Palazzo Comunale (town hal; begun 1460), Palazzo del Podestà (magistrate's residence; 1264) and Palazzo della Prefettura (police HQ; rebuilt 1771): three civic buildings around the central square, Piazza del Plebiscito. The Palazzo Comunale houses a series of 17th century and Baroque frescoes by Tarquinio Ligustri, Bartolomeo Cavarozzi and Ludovico Nucci.
 Santa Maria della Peste: a small 16th-century temple-church (tempietto).
 Santa Maria della Salute: a small Gothic church with a highly decorated portal.
 Chiesa del Gesù: Romanesque-style 11th-century church. The sons of Simon de Montfort, Guy and Simon the Younger stabbed Henry of Almain, son of Richard, Earl of Cornwall to death as a revenge for the execution of their father. 
 Palazzo Farnese: This 14th–15th-century palace was the childhood home of Alessandro Farnese, the future Pope Paul III, and his beautiful  sister, Giulia Farnese.
Rocca (castle).
 Santa Maria Nuova (11th-century), San Sisto (second half of 9th-century), and San Giovanni in Zoccoli (11th-century): three Romanesque churches.
 Palazzo degli Alessandri: a typical medieval patrician house in central Viterbo.
 Fontana di Piazza della Rocca: public fountain in the center of the Old Town, construction 12th–16th century.
 Fontana Grande: public fountain, construction began in 1206.
 San Francesco: gothic church built over a pre-existing Lombard fortress. It has a single nave with a Latin cross plan. It houses the sepulchre of Pope Adrian V, who died in Viterbo in 1276, considered the first monument by Arnolfo di Cambio.
 Sanctuary of Santa Rosa: church is a sober 19th-century reconstruction, where every year a new Macchina di Santa Rosa, or dedicatory tower is displayed.

 Museo Civico: the (City Museum) houses many archeologic items from the pre-historic to Ancient Roman times, plus a Pinacoteca (picture gallery) with works by Sebastiano del Piombo, Antoniazzo Romano, Salvator Rosa, Antiveduto Grammatica and others. 
 Orto Botanico dell'Università della Tuscia: botanical garden operated by the university.

Baths of Viterbo

In the valley of the Arcione River just to the west of Viterbo are a number of springs celebrated for the healing qualities of their waters, and in use since Etruscan and Roman days. In fact, the imposing ruins of a great Roman bath are still to be seen and were drawn in plan and perspective by Renaissance artists including Giuliano da Sangallo, Michelangelo, and Vasari. One of the most famous were the thermal springs known as the "Bulicame", or bubbling place, whose reputation had even reached the ears of the exiled poet Dante Aligheri. Canto 14 (lines 79–81) of Dante's Inferno describes how:

In silence we had reached a place where flowed
a slender watercourse out of the wood—a stream
whose redness makes me shudder still.
As from the Bulicame pours a brook whose
waters are then shared by prostitutes, so did this
stream run down across the sand.

Not far from the Bulicame, whose waters were apparently always taken in the open, is the Terme dei Papi (Bath of the Popes). Almost totally concealed within the structure of a modern luxury spa hotel are the remains of a Renaissance bath palace that attracted the attention of two popes. Actually, the origins of this bathing establishment date to the Middle Ages when it was known as the Bagno della Crociata (named either after a Crusader who supposedly discovered the spring or from a corruption of the Italian word for crutch). Early 15th-century documents describe a bath building that covered three distinct thermal springs all under one roof.

This bath house was transformed circa 1454 by the pope Nicholas V, who commissioned a bath palace (according to Nicholas's biographer, Gianozzo Manetti) "with such magnificence and with such expense that it was not only deemed suitable for a stay and salutary for the sick but seemed an edifice destined to have rooms fit for princes and for living regally." A more precise description of Pope Nicholas' palace was described by the Viterbese chronicler Nicola della Tuccia in the 1470s, who stated the new Bagno del Papa as a battlemented building, resembling a fortress, about 30 x 20 m in size with high towers at the corners of its southern façade. Located outside Viterbo, the spa would have been an easy target for assaults had the building not assumed a militant character, which also affirmed papal authority.  Aside from the regal apartments described by Manedtti there were vaulted chambers at the lowest level to accommodate the patrons of the several thermal springs.

Manetti and Vasari both named the Florentine architect and sculptor Bernardo Rossellino as the architect of the project in Viterbo. There is, however, no documentation or architectural evidence to connect Rossellino directly with the construction of the Bagno del Papa. To the contrary, Vatican payment records from 1454, preserved in the state archives in Rome, identify a stonemason from Lombardy, named Stefano di Beltrame, as the builder who "had done or was doing in the house ordered by the pope at the bagni della Grotta and Crociata of Viterbo."

Construction at the Bagno del Papa was continued on through the reigns of several popes after Nicholas V. The Vatican accounts mention of payments "for building done at the bath palace of Viterbo" during the reigns of Calixtus III, Paul II, and Sixtus IV. There also is evidence Pope Pius II was responsible for the addition of a western wing to the building.

Travelers' descriptions, etched views, and local guidebooks chronicle the fate of the Renaissance Bagno del Papa over the years and through several rebuildings resulting in a general assumption that most of the original 15th-century structure had vanished. A guide to Viterbo from 1911 does note that some remnants were still to be detected in basement piers and vaults. In operation as a thermal hospital in 1927, the building was blown up by retreating German forces in 1944.

Despite all the travails, much of the original Bagno del Papa built by Popes Nicholas V and Pius II survives, including the corner towers and the vaulted chambers where Renaissance patrons once bathed.

Military
Viterbo became a centre of military aviation due to its proximity to Rome, especially after the opening of the Air Force base (now the Rome Viterbo Airport but still used for military purposes) during the 1930s. The Army Aviation Command headquarters and training school (Italian: Scuola marescialli dell'Aeronautica Militare) are both located there.

The Army's NCO training establishment (Italian: Scuola sottufficiali dell'Esercito Italiano) is also located in the city.

Government

Culture

Notable people
Born 
Leonardo Bonucci, footballer
Bartolomeo Cavarozzi (1587–1625), painter
Giacomo Cordelli, painter
Domenico Corvi, Neoclassicist painter
Saint Crispin of Viterbo (né Pietro Fioretti), member of the Friars Minor Capuchin
David D'Antoni, footballer
Giles of Viterbo, Augustinian friar, bishop and cardinal
Cristiano Lombardi, footballer
Giuseppe Ottaviani, trance musician
Gabrielle Réval (1869-1938), novelist, essayist
Saint Rose of Viterbo, patron saint of the city
Federico Viticci, founder and editor-in-chief of MacStories.net

Lived in Viterbo
Leonardo Corbucci, film director
Antonio del Massaro (also known as "Antonio da Viterbo"), painter 
Lorenzo da Viterbo, painter and activist
Reginald Pole, cardinal, archbishop of Canterbury, church reformer
Kathleen Napoli McKenna, Irish Republican activist and journalist

Religion

Patron saints
St. Rose is the patron saint of Viterbo. The legend of Santa Rosa is that she helped to eradicate those few who supported the emperors instead of the popes, around 1250. Saint Lawrence is the male patron saint.

Macchina di Santa Rosa
The transport of the Macchina di Santa Rosa takes place every year, on 3 September, at 9 o'clock in the evening. The Macchina is an artistic illuminated bell-tower with an imposing height of 30 m. It weighs between 3.5 and 5 tonnes and is made of iron, wood and papier-mâché. At the top of the tower, the statue of the patron saint is enthusiastically acclaimed by the people in the streets of the town centre, where lights are turned off for the occasion.   One hundred Viterbesi men (known as the Facchini) carry the Macchina from Porta Romana through each of the major streets of Viterbo to seven churches to be blessed, concluding with a strenuous ascension up to the Piazza di Santa Rosa, its final resting place.  Each Macchina's lifespan differs, but contests for a new design are held every few years.

Transportation 

On 26 November 2007, Italian transport minister Alessandro Bianchi announced that Viterbo had been chosen as the site of the next airport in Lazio to serve Rome. However, in 2013 those plans were abandoned.
Viterbo is served by regional trains departing from Station Ostiense, Trastevere, S. Pietro and sometimes at Termini in Rome. Porta Romana is the station serving the old city center.

Education
The city is home to the Tuscia University, established in 1979. It is also the city where students of School Year Abroad's Italy program study, their school housed in a 16th-century palazzo on Via Cavour.

Twin towns – sister cities
Viterbo is twinned with:

  Binghamton, New York, United States
  Albany, New York, United States
  Santa Rosa de Viterbo, São Paulo, Brazil
  Gubbio, Perugia, Umbria, Italy
  Palmi, Reggio Calabria, Calabria, Italy
  Nola, Naples, Campania, Italy
  Sassari, Sassari, Sardinia, Italy
  Campobasso, Campobasso, Molise, Italy
  Springfield, Massachusetts, United States

Notes

Sources
Charles R. Mack, "The Bath Palace of Nicholas V at Viterbo", in An Architectural Progress in the Renaissance and the Baroque: Sojourns In and Out of Italy, Papers in Art History VIII, Pennsylvania State University, Vol. I, 1992, 45–63.
Charles R. Mack, "The Renaissance Spa: Testing the Architectural Waters",  Southeastern College Art Conference Review, XI, 3, 1988, 193–200.
Valtieri, Simonetta, "Rinascimento a Viterbo: Bernardo Rossellino",  Architettura, croniche e storia, XVII, 1972, 686–94.

External links 

 , 
 ViterboLive.it 
 Tuscia 360 about Viterbo, including virtual tour featuring several VR panoramas
 Viterbo Tourist Promotion
 ViterboOnline.Com
 Festa delle Ciliegie  (Cherry Festival and other information)
 Viterbo Video Guide
 Museo del Colle del Duomo (Pope palace) Pope palace, Museo del Colle del Duomo
 International Festival from July to September

 
Cities and towns in Lazio
Gothic architecture in Lazio